Šķilbēni Parish is an administrative unit of Balvi Municipality in the Latgale region of Latvia.

Towns, villages and settlements of Šķilbēni Parish 
  - parish administrative center
 Ančipova

References 

Parishes of Latvia
Balvi Municipality
Latgale